Nyhavn 20, also known as the Boel House (Danish: Boels Gård), is a listed property overlooking the Nyhavn canal in central Copenhagen, Denmark. A plaque on the facade commemorates that Hans Christian Andersen lived in the building when he had his first fairytale published.

History

18th century

Nyhavn 20 was built in 1778–68 for Andreas Bodenhoff. He lived at Nyhavn 31 on the other side of the canal and had previously also built Nyhavn 12. The building was probably constructed by master timber Samuel Blichfeldt (1749-1787).

After Bodenhoff's death in 1894, his son Andreas Bodenhoff Jr. took over the building as well as his father's timber business. When his brother, Rasmus Bodenhoff died in 1795, he also took over the family's shipyard in Christianshavn. He married the daughter of his mother's sister, Hjertrud Birgitte Rosted. Just five months after the wedding, Andreas Bodenhoof Jr. fell ill and died. Gjertrud Bodenhoff, who just 19 years old had become the richest widow in the city, lived in the building. She was popular among the poor for her philanthropic work among them. In 1698, she died under suspicious circumstances. It is believed that she was buried alive and subsequently woken up and murdered by tomb raiders.

19th century

From 1 September 1834, Hans Christian Andersen was a lodger on the second floor, renting two rooms from Karen Sophie Larsen who was the widow of a skipper. Andersen's sleeping room faced the courtyard and the Botanical Garden which was then located in Vharlottenborg's garden, while his combined living room and study faced the canal. In a letter to Henriette Hanck from 1 January 1835, on her request, Andersen made a detailed description of his home at Nyhavn 20.

Andersen wrote his first fairytales while living in the building. They were published in May 1835. The small booklet contained the stories The Tinderbox, Little Claus and Big Claus, The Princess and the Pea and  Little Idas Flowers. He published a total of six booklets with Fairy Tales Told for Children in the period 1835–1842, followed by New Fairytales published in the period  1843–1848. Andersen also wrote the novels O.T. and Kun en Spillemand (1837) and completed The Improvisatore while he lived at Nyhavn 20. In his diary, he describes an episode where he suddenly felt cold while working on The Improvisator. When he opened the door to the neighbouring room, he found out that his land lady and the maid had opened the windows and poured water on the floor, so that her four children could slide on it when the water froze. On 1 December 1838, Andersen had grown so tired of the conditions that he moved to Hotel du Nord which was located at the site where the Magasin du Nord department store lies today.

The painter Wilhelm Marstrand was a resident in the building in 1843–44. His next home was located at Frederiksholms Kanal 12. The medical doctor C. E. Fenger lived in the building right after he had become a professor in Chinese medicine at the University of Copenhagen.

20th century 
The building was listed by the Danish Heritage Agency in the Danish national registry of protected buildings in 1918. Holger Prior, a coffee wholesaler, was based in the building until the 1950s. The company Boels Food purchased the building in 1960. The company had been founded by Esper Boel when he purchased Lundby Dairy on the island of Falster in 1941. Nyhavn 20 became the new headquarters of his company. In 1967, he also acquired the manor house Kjærstrup at Holeby on the island of Lolland.

Architecture
The building is ten bays wide and has two three-bay wall dormers.

Today
Most of the building has now been converted into rooms for neighbouring Hotel Bethel.

References

External links

 Nyhavn at indenforvoldene.dk
 Source - Company

Listed residential buildings in Copenhagen
Residential buildings completed in 1779
Buildings in Copenhagen associated with Hans Christian Andersen